Ronnie Apteker (born ) is a South African internet pioneer, writer and film producer.

Early life
Ronnie Apteker was born in Cape Town, South Africa, and attended high school and University of the Witwatersrand, from where he graduated cum laude with an M.Sc. in computer science.

Business career
In 1993, Apteker co-founded Internet Solutions, South Africa's first Internet service Provider (ISP) in 1993. It became a successful post-apartheid businesses, winning numerous technology awards. Apteker has written a number of papers, published both locally and internationally. In February 1994, he presented a paper in San Jose, California, on Distributed Multimedia to the International Society for Optical Engineering. This paper was subsequently published in the SPIE/IEEE Proceedings.

In 2002, Apteker sponsored and produced the Laugh Out Loud fundraiser, South Africa's largest stand-up comedy TV show. It raised half a million Rand for the Reach for a Dream foundation.

Apteker is a partner in the video games company Room 8 Studio, which developed games such as Piano City and Cyto's Puzzle Adventure.

Apteker became an advisor at 10Guards in Kyiv, in December 2018.

Apteker has some IT investments and is currently involved with PYGIO.

As a recognized business leader and speaker he has appeared at the Discovery Leadership alongside others such as Sir Richard Branson, Tony Blair and Al Gore

Books
 Ronnie Apteker's Funny Business: the Secrets of an Accidental Entrepreneur, Zebra Press, 2010
 Do You Love IT in the Morning?, Apteker, Ronnie & Ord, Jeremy, Media Africa & the Publishing Partnership, 1999
 Trading Spaces: Exploring Internet Solutions,  Apteker, Ronnie, Intelligence Publishing, 1996

Film production
Since 2000, Apteker has been one of the leading independent film producers in South Africa.  His films include Material, Tell Me Sweet Something and Cold Harbour. Etc. etc. Despite critical and popular acclaim within South Africa, some of the films have failed to find the wider international acclaim that many feel they deserve. Apteker's involvement in the South African comedy club scene has led to several comedians appearing in his films, most notably Riaad Moosa, Joey Rasdien and Vincent Ebrahim from the BBC's The Kumars at No. 42 who appeared in the film Material. 
 
 2022 57 (producer)
 2020 Courting Anathi (executive producer)
 2020 Material II (producer)
 2019 Matwetwe (executive producer)
 2018 Feedom (executive producer)
 2017 Catching Feelings (executive producer)
 2016 Vaya (producer)
 2016 Beyond The River (producer)
 2015 Tell Me Sweet Something (producer)
 2015 Tiger House (producer)
 2013 Cold Harbour (producer)
 2013 Nothing for Mahala (executive producer) 
 2012 Sleeper's Wake (executive producer) 
 2012 Material (producer) 
 2008 Reeker 2 (executive producer) 
 2008 Gangster's Paradise: Jerusalema (executive producer) 
 2007 Footskating 101 (producer) 
 2005 Out on a Limb (executive producer) 
 2005 Crazy Monkey presents...Straight Outta Benoni (producer) 
 2005 The Flyer (executive producer)
 2005 Reeker (executive producer) 
 2003 Laugh Out Loud (TV Movie) (executive producer) 
 2002 Purpose (producer - as Ronen Apteker)

References 

University of the Witwatersrand alumni
1967 births
People from Cape Town
Living people
South African film producers